Lafourak (also Romanized as Lafoūrak) is a village in Lafour Rural District, North Savadkuh County, Mazandaran Province, Iran. At the 2006 census, its population was 24, in 7 families.

References 

Populated places in Savadkuh County